Symphyopappus is a genus of South American plants in the tribe Eupatorieae within the family Asteraceae.

 Species
 Symphyopappus angustifolius Cabrera - Minas Gerais, Bahia
 Symphyopappus apurimacensis H.Rob. - Apurímac 
 Symphyopappus brasiliensis (Gardner) R.M.King & H.Rob. - Minas Gerais
 Symphyopappus casarettoi B.L.Rob. - Paraná, Rio Grande do Sul, Santa Catarina
 Symphyopappus compressus (Gardner) B.L.Rob. - Bahia, Paraná, Rio Grande do Sul, Santa Catarina, D.F., São Paulo, Minas Gerais, Goiás 
 Symphyopappus cuneatus (DC.) Sch.Bip. ex Baker - Paraná, Santa Catarina, São Paulo, Minas Gerais, Rio de Janeiro
 Symphyopappus decemflorus H.Rob. - Minas Gerais
 Symphyopappus decussatus Turcz. - Minas Gerais, Bahia
 Symphyopappus itatiayensis (Hieron.) R.M.King & H.Rob. - Paraná, Santa Catarina, São Paulo, Minas Gerais, Rio de Janeiro, D.F.
 Symphyopappus lymansmithii B.L.Rob. - Paraná, Santa Catarina, São Paulo, Rio Grande do Sul, Espirito Santo
 Symphyopappus myricifolius B.L.Rob. - Minas Gerais
 Symphyopappus reitzii (Cabrera) R.M.King & H.Rob. - Santa Catarina
 Symphyopappus reticulatus Baker - Minas Gerais
 Symphyopappus uncinatus H.Rob - Minas Gerais

 formerly included
See Goyazianthus Neocabreria Raulinoreitzia 
 Symphyopappus catharinensis - Neocabreria catharinensis 
 Symphyopappus leptophlebius - Raulinoreitzia leptophlebia
 Symphyopappus pennivenius - Neocabreria pennivenia 
 Symphyopappus tetrastichus - Goyazianthus tetrastichus

References

Asteraceae genera
Flora of South America
Eupatorieae
Taxa named by Nikolai Turczaninow